Taraxacum pseudoroseum is a species of flowering plant.

References

pseudoroseum